10th SDFCS Awards
December, 2005

Best Film: 
 King Kong 
The 10th San Diego Film Critics Awards, honouring the best in film for 2005, were given in December, 2005 by the San Diego Film Critics Society.

Winners
Best Actor: 
Philip Seymour Hoffman - Capote
Best Actress: 
Joan Allen - The Upside of Anger
Best Animated Film: 
Howl's Moving Castle (Hauru no ugoku shiro)
Best Director: 
Bennett Miller - Capote
Best Documentary Film: 
Grizzly Man
Best Film: 
King Kong
Best Foreign Language Film: 
Innocent Voices (Voces inocentes) • Mexico/United States/Puerto Rico
Best Screenplay: 
Capote - Dan Futterman
Best Supporting Actor: 
Jeffrey Wright - Broken Flowers
Best Supporting Actress: 
Rachel Weisz - The Constant Gardener

2
2005 film awards
2005 in American cinema